Model Behaviour is an American 1982 romantic comedy film by director Bud Gardner, starring Anne Marie Howard and Richard Bekins. The film was produced by Boptex Studio in the United States of America.

Synopsis 
Fresh out of college, an aspiring photographer and his ad-man partner set out to take the modeling industry by storm. A lovely model captures the photographer's heart.

References

External links 

American independent films
1982 romantic comedy films
1982 films
1980s American films